John Rankin was a Scottish footballer who played as an outside right for Third Lanark and Airdrieonians.

In seven active seasons with Thirds (he made no appearances at all in the 1914–15 season, possibly due to commitments relating to World War I) he played in two Scottish Cup semi-finals (1912 and 1914), one Glasgow Cup final and two Charity Cup finals, but finished on the losing side on each occasion. During 1911 Rankin was selected once for the Scottish Football League XI and took part in the Home Scots v Anglo-Scots international trial, and the following year represented the Glasgow FA in their annual challenge match against Sheffield.

References

Scottish footballers
Year of birth missing
19th-century births
Year of death missing
20th-century deaths
Association football outside forwards
Scottish Football League players
Scottish Junior Football Association players
Scottish Football League representative players
Strathclyde F.C. players
Third Lanark A.C. players
Airdrieonians F.C. (1878) players